"" ("The Green and White Flag") is the official anthem of Andalusia, an autonomous community of Spain, adopted under the first Andalusian Statute of Autonomy. The lyrics were written by Blas Infante. The music for the anthem of Andalusia was composed by the former director of the municipal band of Sevilla, José del Castillo Díaz. The origins of the music are vaguely inspired on the Santo Dios, a religious cantic widely spread in rural Andalusia, usually sung by peasants while reaping their crops. It is believed that Blas Infante suggested the music to José del Castillo. The melody of the anthem is Castillo's original though. After the Spanish Civil War, the original music scores were destroyed, and only a manuscript for piano is conserved. The composer Manuel Castillo improved José del Castillo's version.

Lyrics

See also
 Anthems of the autonomous communities of Spain

References

Notes

External links
Andalusia's government page about the anthem (Contains links to mp3 versions of the anthem)

Spanish anthems
Regional songs
Andalusian culture
Spanish-language songs